Saint-Bonnet-l'Enfantier (Limousin: Sent Bonet l’Enfantier) is a commune in the Corrèze department in central France.

Population

See also
Communes of the Corrèze department

References

Communes of Corrèze